J & B Caldwell Ltd v Logan House Retirement Home Ltd [1999] 2 NZLR 99; (1998) 9 TCLR 112 is a cited case in New Zealand regarding the quantification of damages for breach of contract.

References

New Zealand contract case law